Marok Gandu, also Marock Gandu and Marok Gandu of Magata (18?? - 1902) was a West African anti-slave raiding Atyap war leader who died in defense of his homeland.

Gandu was  He was later captured by the Hausa forces led by the last independent king of Zazzau (Zaria), Muhammad Kwassau, during his 1902 raid on the Atyap which had been on since circa 1897. According to British claims, these raids caused the massacre of only over 1,000 Atyap people. Gandu hailed from Magata, an important village of the Jei sub-clan of the Agbaat clan, which happens to be the leading military clan of the Atyap. His heroic acts as a legendary commander against external aggression in the history of his people's resistance was thought to have been almost totally neglected.

Capture and execution

Kazah-Toure's version
Gandu was captured in 1902 by the Hausa feudal forces in an ambush while the Atyap staged a fight but could not salvage their leader. He was tortured and later executed by impalement at Santswan forest, Atyapland. A spear was then plunged into his heart from his chest. To symbolise mockery, a flowing gown of the Hausa was then worn over his body and a turban round his head. Other Atyap fighters caught by the Kwassau forces were then led to the execution spot and told to behold their chief. It was reported that Kwassau resorted to impaling his captives on stakes, setting others ablaze alive and burying yet others alive, to force the rest of the people into submission.

Ninyio's version
Another version presented by Ninyio (2008) from an oral account reveals the capture of Gandu as thus:  He was reportedly impaled on a stake after the dramatic mockery. The execution of which led to a great weakening of Atyap resistance against the British on the eve of the colonial invasion.

Dauke's versions
Dauke (2004:39-49) presented two versions. The first narrated that it was under the last battle between Zazzau and the Atyab which occurred in the same year Lord Lugard reached Zaria in 1902, that the Sarkin Zazzau (Emir of Zazzau), Muhammadu Lawal Kwasau (1897-1902), called the battle of San-Tswuan, in which Kwasau was determined to inflict ultimate damage on the Atyab through brutality and made a treaty with the Chawai people not to aid the Atyab against him, thereby resorting to the Atyab use of guerilla tactics by hiding in the hills and using of spikes to make things difficult for Kwasau's horsemen, that some Atyab courageous men took the challenge, one of which was Marok Gandu the legend from the Jei sub-clan of the Agbaad clan. Marok fought alongside his group gallantly but due to being out-numbered by Kwasau's army, was captured and executed on a stake which pierced through his bottom right up into his head. He was also said to have requested for a puff of tobacco smoke from a pipe while he fought death on the spear. There were no any other records on the personality of Marok, but there was a Gugwa (horn music) in Atyabland sang in his memory, whose wordings were:

The second version is considered unpopular. This version is said to have come from unclear sources and does not relate Marok's heroism to Kwasau's wars, but to a theft-related offense he was said to have committed, the result of which he got a public execution to serve as a warning to others. The version also is said to have related Marok's execution to his defiant way, being that, as said here, he stole from the Hausa people which won the hearts of his people, who considered the Hausa as "Zazzau's agents of oppression". Dauke, however, in his investigation discovered that no public execution took place in Zangon Kataf except one which happened between 1925 and 1930, involving two Asholyio (Marwa) men who thought their acts would be applauded were executed during Ja'afaru's reign as District Head in Zangon Kataf town, for robbing a Hausa trader of a horse, at a time when Zazzau slave-raiders still attacked the Atyab seldom. Hence, with the findings of this investigation, Marok's execution was confirmed to have been related to the war with Zazzau, after which Kwasau, assuming to be victorious against the Atyab, returned to Zaria only to meet Lord Lugard awaiting him, who arrested, tried and exiled him for his brutality to Lokoja.

Others
Yohanna (2004) and Akau (2014) also made mention of his execution, but with a date at variance with the others'.

Legacy
According to Kazah-Toure in Achi et al. (2019), a solemn song was sung in his memory up until the 1940s, all over Atyapland during celebrations and ceremonies, to remember his heroism, fall, brutal execution and the turbulent times of his days, and which ironically was not composed in Tyap, but in Hausa language. The wordings were roughly captured as thus:  in Hausa and translates into:

References 

Footnotes

In-citations

 Bibliography
 
 

Atyap people
Executed people
20th-century executions
African warriors
1902 deaths